Howmeh-ye Kerend Rural District is a rural district (dehestan) in the Central District of Dalahu County, Kermanshah Province, Iran. At the 2006 census, its population was 5,682, in 1,285 families. The rural district has 19 villages.

References 

Rural Districts of Kermanshah Province
Dalahu County